Neonerita is a genus of moths in the family Erebidae. The genus was erected by George Hampson in 1901.

Species
 Neonerita dorsipuncta Hampson, 1901
 Neonerita fenestrata (Rothschild, 1910)
 Neonerita parapressa Dognin, 1911
 Neonerita pulchra Toulgoët, 1983

Former species
 Pseudepimolis haemasticta Dognin, 1906
 Pseudepimolis incisa Schaus, 1910
 Trichromia metaphoenica Joicey & Talbot, 1917
 Trichromia postsuffusa Rothschild, 1922
 Trichromia yahuasae Joicey & Talbot, 1916

References

External links

 

Phaegopterina
Moth genera